From 1961-2014, the nonprofit Human Interaction Research Institute (HIRI) helped nonprofits, funders and communities handle the challenges of innovation and change, using behavioral science strategies. The Institute was based in Los Angeles. Its work ranged from research, to technical assistance on systems change, to disseminating innovations or helping others to do so. The emphasis in all these activities was on the complex human dynamics of change - how to get people personally committed to change and feel rewarded for their involvement, and how to address people's fears and resistances about change.

Under the leadership of President Dr. Thomas Backer and a multi-disciplinary Board of Directors, the  Institute had a tradition of community service, ranging from individual efforts of staff (working with advocacy and support organizations such as the National Alliance on Mental Illness), to coordinating volunteer groups such as the Entertainment Industry Workplace AIDS Task Force, to hosting (with California State University Northridge) both the first Los Angeles conference on AIDS in the workplace (April 1987) and an April 2003 event on nonprofit capacity building.

Products from these projects were disseminated in both print and electronic formats. The Institute's work was supported by Federal and State agencies, foundations, and the corporate sector. To learn about the Institute's key areas of work, go here, and to download many of the Institute's publications, go to HIRI Publications. For more information on the Institute's history, you can view the HIRI 30 Year Report or view the HIRI 40 Year Report.

Education in Los Angeles